Otuocha also known as Otuoche is a town and Headquarters of Anambra East Local Government Area of Anambra State, Nigeria. It was previously a divisional headquarters of Anambra Divisional council during the first (1st) Republic and also the old Local Government Headquarters of Old Anambra local government area that was broken to create the following four prevalent local governments: Anambra East, Anambra West, Oyi and Ayamelum LGAs.

It has a large population as many people from different ethnic groups in Nigerian dwell in the land. These people include not only the original Igbo natives of Umueri but others from other parts of Nigeria including the Igala, Hausa, Ijaw, Yoruba, etc.
The history of "Otuocha" has been the source of problem that exist between the two major groups that live in Otuocha land. The Oral source from Umueri had it that Otuocha land was earlier known as Otu-Oche and was a farmstead (Farmland) belonging to the people of Amukwa-Adegbe Village of Ancient Umueri Kingdom.

Origin 
The small parcel of land that was later expanded and known as Otuocha was owned by One Ogbuevi Oche from Amukwa-Adegbe Village and the land was then known as "Otu-Oche (referring to the "Port" or shores of Oche), being the fact that it is at the bank of the Great Omambala River where many other "ports" or local "wharfs" are located. Though at the beginning, it was a very small portion within the shores of the Omambala (Anambra) River but with migration and expansion, it extends to includes some parts of Aguarkor in the west and Offianwagbo in the East. The name was originally called "Otuoche" but was corrupted by the advent of Europeans who mispronounced the name as "Otuocha". 
Originally Oche's descendants brought Onyekome Idigo, the progenitor of Idigo family to Otuocha being a "nwadiana" or nephew to the Oche's family and that he was the person that brought his people into the land. Onyekome Idigo’s descendants make up the ruling royal family in Aguleri until date. 

The Major people living in the town of Otuocha are the Aguleri, Umuoba-Anam, and Umueri people. Whereas, the Aguleri dwell mostly in the northern part of the town, Umueri are found mostly in the southern part of the town, along the tarred road leading from Oya-Agu Abagana to Otuocha market. Another groups found in the town are the Umuoba Anam who co-habits the central part of the town along with the two hosts. There are other groups from other part of Igboland living as tenants and residents in the town and these include the Hausa, Ijaw and Yoruba communities

Land Dispute and Crisis Between Umuleri and Aguleri 
The crux of problems that militate against the growth of this town lies in the age-long land disputes over Otuocha land which have led to lots of violence and animosities between the two hosts, Aguleri and Umuleri communities. The question is which of the two communities first settled at the land and which of them has superior claim over the territory now called Otuocha? The case was first heard in 1933 when Umueri leaders sued Aguleri over the land but lost because they had earlier sold the land to Royal Niger Company Limited and therefore had been divested of the rights or title to the land according to the judgement then. The court held that Umueri has nothing left to justify the court giving them declaration of title. Aguleri sensing the loss of case, sued Umueri in 1935 but lost too on the ground that they too could not establish exclusive ownership of the land.

Migration of Umuoba-Anam into Otuocha 
Umuoba Anam, another major community in the town and who also was involved in the crisis of 1999, claimed to have migrated into the land in early years of last century precisely in 1900. According to one of the principal witnesses during the Supreme Court's case of 1984, he stated that on entering the land, they were received by the people of Aguleri who collected some money, cows and many other items as an agreement to sell portions of Otuocha land to them. He went further to state that in 1910, the people of Umuleri invaded their land and attacked them but they engaged in peace settlement with Umuleri. As wealthy settlers, they purchased the land too from Umuleri, thereby paying the same price which they had earlier paid to the people of Aguleri.

After 1984 Supreme Court of Nigeria judgment, there was a relative peace existing between the communities until in September 1995 when Umueri community invaded the Aguleri, killing, maiming and destroying properties belonging to the people of Aguleri. From the reports of World Organisation Against Torture & Center for Law Enforcement Education, the crisis emanated in 1994 when Aguleri decided to establish a Motor Park/Market at a location on contested Agu Akor land and destroyed the Blessed Virgin Mary statue mounted on Our Lady of Victory Cathedral Otuocha belonging to the Umueri. It was rumored that Aguleri had been planning to attack Umueri with the support of the then local Government Chairman who was from Aguleri. Umueri petitioned and the then State Government who drafted Mobile policemen into Otuocha between December 1994 and April 1995. This action buried the plots and avoided the violence that would have ensued. Following the re-deployment of the anti-riot policemen out of Otuocha, members of Umuleri community attacked Aguleri on 30 September – 3 October 1995, unleashing massive destruction of human lives and property.
In 1995, a Judiciary panel of inquiry was set up by the then Military Government of Anambra State to investigate the crisis and recommend solutions to avoid future occurrence. The report of the Judiciary Panel of Inquiry amongst many other things indicted the then Chairman of the Local Government(an Aguleri native) and the Divisional Police Office (DPO) for involvement(taking sides)in the conflict. It also recommended that State government rebuild many of the destroyed Public Buildings which including Umueri Technical College, Girls High School, Otuocha Postal Office, General Hospital Umueri, etc. The Government of the day then declined to implement or accept the recommendations. In apparent retaliation for yet to be redressed violence of 1995, it was said that the Umueri youths launched attacked on Aguleri in April 1999. The reprisal attacks was said to be carried out because of rumor making round that Aguleri people who at then was engaging in funeral ceremonies of the indicted chairman (who died immediately at the end of 1995 crisis) "wanted seven human heads" to give the former local Government chairman a befitting burial. Another factor was Government disinterestedness in the recommendations of the Panel, amongst many others.

Involvement of Umuoba Anam in 1999 Crisis 
Umuoba Anam is third of the three Major communities that make up Otuocha. According to a book entitle "Anambra Day break " written By Ifediora Nwabunwanne, they bought their settlement from Umueri in 1900 where as report from World Organization Against Torture and Center for law Enforcement Education the settlement was bought in 1898 from the Aguleri Community but following incessant harassment from Umuleri for the same settlement, in 1910 they entered into another purchase agreement with Umueri for the same settlement. The Umuoba Anam have always provided a safer zone between the Aguleris and Umueris in the spasmodic crisis between the two Communities. Umuoba Anam also sheltered the displaced people who fled to them for refuge during the attacks of 1995. The cause of their involvement in 1999 is not yet clear. It is alleged that they (Umu Oba Anam) joined forces with Aguleri to attack Umueri. According to the Umueri source, Aguleri and Umuoba Anam, reached a pact that if Umuoba Anam joined them to chase Umueri out of the area, the Aguleri community would give Umuoba Anam more land to expand their settlement. Umueri during the course of 1995 "war' shot Nine of their[Umuoba Anam’s] sons; killed one and where treated with disdain by Umueri when they complained to them about this saying that it is one after the other(meaning that after they the Umueri's have finished with Agulueri, it will be the turn of Umuoba). This caused resentment within the Umuoba Community and in retaliation for the killing they joined the crisis.
The crisis was eventually brought to an end by the interference of the federal Government of Olusegun Obasanjo whom personally visited the effected areas and invited the leaders of the three communities to the state house for a meeting.

Infrastructure and government/public buildings 
The basic infrastructure of the city was built at a time when the town was the headquarters of Anambra county council and Old Anambra Local Government. Due to crisis and perceived Government Neglects, there is no much improvement in basic infrastructure. The followings are public Infrastructures in Otuocha: The Local Government Secretariat,Divisional Police Head Office along the Otuocha-Oyeagu Road,the Aguleri Post office,Nipost Umueri etc.
There are many Schools in Otuocha which Includes: St. Joseph ’s Primary School, Ovuakwu Primary School, Ochei Primary school amongst many others. There are also banks which includes First Bank of Nigeria PlC, Aguleri community bank, Umuoba Anam Community Bank and Umueri Community bank.

Religion and places of worships 
Though Otuocha just like any other town in Anambra enclave worships Traditional African gods but with advent of Europeans and Christianity, a lot of churches have sprung up in the town amongst the following: St Joseph's Pro-Cathedral, Aguleri; Our Lady of Victory Catholic Church Umueri; St Augustine's Catholic Church, Umuoba Anam; St Gabriel's Anglican Church Udeabor Umueri, many other denominational churches; as well as Otuocha mosque in Umuoba Anam.

Market and shopping facilities 
Otuocha has a viable Market call "Eke" Market. It is located within the heart of Otuocha at the bank of the Great Omabala River. Though market activities goes along daily in the market, "Eke" Market day is a special market day as traders and buyers from all walks of life comes for business. The market is also a major Yam transit point in East of Niger

Climate
In Otuocha, the wet season is warm, and overcast and the dry season is hot, muggy, and humid. Over the course of the year, the temperature typically varies from 67 °F to 89 °F and is rarely below 59 °F or above 92 °F.The temperature in Otuocha varies a little throughout the year hardly to differienciate hot and cold season. January and December are the best month to go for holiday or travel to Otuocha. In these month temperature is at around 37 °C and average of 289.6429 hours of sunshine in a month.August and July are the coldest months with temperature at around 22 °C  while the month of July and September receive most rainfall with precipitation count of 368.51mm.

Supreme Court Judgment Over Land disputes 

History of Otuocha land dispute which first occurred in 1933. The chronicles are reproduced hereunder:

1. 1933 PROVINCIAL COURT

Suit No: 2/1933

Plaintiff/appellant/ lawyers: Umueri 
                         Defendants/lawyers: Aguleri

Ruling/Remark: Captain DPJ O’Connor, District Officer, Onitsha Province and trial Judge Ruled in favour of Umueri

2. Suit No: Unavailable:      
 
Plaintiff/appellant/ lawyers: Aguleri. - Aguleri appealed against O’  Connor’s ruling
                         Defendants/ lawyer: Umueri

Ruling/Remark: The Judge, Graham Paul reversed O’Connor’s judgment

3. 1935 ONITSHA HIGH COURT
                         
Suit No: 0/85/1935

Plaintiff/appellant/ lawyers: Umueri was represented by Onyeama, Soetan and Osadebe

Defendants/ lawyer: Aguleri was represented by Balonwu.

Ruling/Remark: Judge Harry Waddington dismissed the case as ‘non suit’ because Umueri provided little evidence.

4. 1950 Umuiguedo Native Court
                         
Suit No: 0/48/1950

Plaintiff/appellant/ lawyers: Umueri

Defendants/ lawyers: Aguleri.

Remarks: The case was transferred to Onitsha Supreme (High) Court

5. 1951 ONITSHA SUPREME COURT

Suit No: 0/48/1950

Plaintiff/appellant/ lawyers: Umueri was represented by Soetan and Araka

Defendants/ lawyers: Aguleri was represented by Balonwu

Remark: The Court presided by WH Hurley delivered judgement in favour of Aguleri

6. 1955 WEST AFRICAN COURT OF APPEAL (WACA)

Suit No: 226/1955

Plaintiff/appellant/ lawyers: Umueri was represented by Dingle Foot QC

Defendants/ lawyers: Aguleri was represented by Pheneas Quass QC

Ruling/Remark: Justice Cyril Hubbard and Foster Sutton delivered judgment in favor of the defendants, Aguleri

7. 1965 HIGH COURT, ONITSHA OKEKE

Suit No: 0/21965

Plaintiff/Appellants: Umueri

Defendants: Minister of Local Government of the Eastern Region

Ruling/Remark: The court could not conclude the case before the outbreak of the Nigerian/Biafran Civil War

8. 1975 HIGH COURT, ONITSHA

Suit No: 0/98/1975

Plaintiff/Appellants: Aguleri

Defendants: Umueri

Ruling/Remark: The presiding Judge, Justice Umezinwa ruled in favor of Umueri

9. 1978 APPEAL COURT, ENUGU

Suit No: FCA/E/231/1978

Plaintiff/Appellants: Aguleri appealed against the ruling of Onitsha High Court

Defendants: Umueri  
              Ruling/Remarks: In 1981, the Appeal Court reversed the ruling of Umezinwa

10. 1982 SUPREME COURT, LAGOS

Suit No: SC/65/1982

Plaintiffs/Appellants: Umueri appealed against Appeal Court ruling

Defendants: Aguleri

Ruling/Remark: Ruling in 1984, the Supreme Court restored the judgment of Umezinwa in favor of Umuleri.

References 

Populated places in Anambra State